Maulik Navin Pancholy (born January 18, 1974) is an American actor and author who is best known for his roles as Jonathan on 30 Rock, Baljeet Tjinder in Phineas and Ferb, Neal in the first season of Whitney, and as a character named Sanjay Patel in both Weeds and Sanjay and Craig. His debut novel, The Best at It (from Balzer + Bray/HarperCollins), is about a gay, Indian American boy coming into his own. In 2022, he released Nikhil Out Loud, which tells the story of eighth grade theater kids rising up against homophobia in their community.

Early life
Pancholy was born in Dayton, Ohio to Gita Jayantilal and Navin Chimanal Pancholy. He moved around while growing up, living in Ohio, Indiana, and Texas before his family settled in Tampa, Florida, where he attended junior high and high school at Berkeley Preparatory School. His family comes from Gujarat, and his grandparents lived in Ahmedabad. He is a 1991 graduate of the Berkeley Preparatory School in Tampa, and went on to major in Theatre at Northwestern University, where he received his bachelor's degree in 1995. He then attended the Yale School of Drama, where he received his Master of Fine Arts in 2003.

Career

Pancholy played the character of Jonathan on the award-winning NBC series 30 Rock, Sanjay Patel on Showtime's Weeds and Nickelodeon's Sanjay & Craig, Neal on the first season of NBC's Whitney, and voiced the character of Baljeet Tjinder on Disney's Phineas & Ferb. Additional television work includes guest roles on The Good Fight, The Good Wife, Elementary, Dynasty, Friends from College, Tracey Takes On..., The Sopranos, Law & Order: Criminal Intent, and The Comeback.

On February 13, 2017, StarTrek.com stated that Pancholy will play Nambue, Chief Medical Officer of the USS Shenzhou in the upcoming TV series Star Trek: Discovery. His character appeared in the pilot episode, "The Vulcan Hello", which aired on 24 September 2017, and streamed on CBS's online service in America and Netflix abroad.

His stage credits in New York City include the Culture Project's production of Guantanamo: Honor Bound to Defend Freedom in 2004, a workshop of the play Morbidity & Mortality at the historic Cherry Lane Theatre in 2005, and the lead role in India Awaiting at the Samuel Beckett Theatre. In January 2015, he joined the cast of Terrence McNally's It's Only a Play, replacing Rupert Grint when the production's Broadway run was extended. Washington DC stage credits include Katherina in an all-male version of the Shakespeare Theatre Company's "The Taming of The Shrew" in 2016. He starred as 'Kevin' in the world premiere engagement of Ken Urban's The Remains at the Studio Theatre in 2018.

In 2019, Pancholy played 'Tommy' in Bess Wohl's Grand Horizons at the Williamstown Theatre Festival. It was announced that he will reprise the role in Second Stage's Broadway production of the play at the Helen Hayes Theater.

Personal life
Pancholy came out as gay in a November 2013 interview with Out in which he discussed his partner of nine years, chef and caterer Ryan Corvaia. They were engaged at the Taj Mahal in January 2014 and were married in September that year.

Pancholy speaks Gujarati and Spanish. He is also proficient in Hindi, which he speaks in the 30 Rock episode "Khonani".

Political activism
On April 25, 2014, Pancholy was named to President Barack Obama's Advisory Commission on Asian Americans and Pacific Islanders as part of the White House Initiative on Asian Americans and Pacific Islanders. On February 25, 2017, Pancholy and nine other members of the commission resigned from their positions, citing administrative actions by President Donald Trump that they claimed went "against the commission's principles".

Pancholy is active with several non-profit and social policy organizations including Asian Americans Advancing Justice - Los Angeles, the New York City Anti-Violence Project, and OutRight Action International, formerly known as the International Gay and Lesbian Human Rights Commission.

Pancholy is the Chair and Co-Founder of the anti-bullying nonprofit Act To Change. He helped launch the campaign during his time serving on President Obama's Advisory Commission. Act To Change was transitioned outside of the White House after the 2016 presidential election.

Filmography

Film

Television

Stage

References

External links

Out of the Weeds, Nirali Magazine, December 2006 
Television Without Pity- The Maulik Pancholy Interview

1974 births
Living people
American male film actors
American male actors of Indian descent
American male television actors
American gay actors
Northwestern University School of Communication alumni
Male actors from Dayton, Ohio
Yale School of Drama alumni
American people of Gujarati descent
American LGBT rights activists
American LGBT people of Asian descent
LGBT people from Ohio